Lou Ros (born 1984) is a French painter. Ros is known for his figurative-come-expressionist and abstract art. He is a notable exponent of the figurative expressionist Movement.

Biography
Ros was born in Pithiviers and grew up at La Rochelle, a little city. His mother, Régine Chopinot, is a choreographer, and his father, Yanick Ros, worked with his mother as a Technical Director.

When Ros was 16 years old, Ros discovered Marcel Duchamp, inspired by whom he started doing graffiti.

Lou Ros has been known for his portrait and landscape paintings for many years that take the human face or the figure as a starting point for painterly expression.

Style
Ros’s artistic style is a reflection of his encounter with people, places, and self.  Each of his compositions is influenced by images of films, both his own and those taken from several social media platforms. His artworks represent bodies, animals or landscape.

Selected exhibitions

Solo exhibitions
 2018 - « Somewhere² », Allouche Gallery, New York
 2018 - « Quelque part », Galerie Flash, Munich
 2017 - « PIN UP ***** », Galerie Dukan, Paris
 2017 - « Salut Jack », Christopher Moller Gallery, Cape Town
 2016 - « HIJACK », Galerie Guido Romero Pierini, Paris
 2016 - « Somewhere », Dolby Chadwick Gallery, San Francisco
 2015 - « Irgendwo », Galerie Flash, Munich
 2014 - « Portraits », Galerie Guido Romero Pierini, Paris 
 2013 - « À double sens », Galerie Lili-Ubel, Paris
 2011 - « Paper faces », Tache Gallery, New York

Group exhibitions
 2019 - « MUTATIO », Curateur Franck James Marlot , Paris
 2019 - « Portraitures », Robert Fontaine Gallery, Miami
 2019 - « D’un surgissement, l’autre », Curateur Julien Carbone, Paris
 2018 - « Carte blanche », Galerie Hengevoss Durkop, Hambourg
 2018 - « Depict the mask », CGK CCA, Copenhagen
 2017 - « Solace », Booth Gallery, New York
 2016 - « Exposition collective », Galerie Guido Romero Pierini, Paris
 2015 - « Fantasy of Representation », Beers Gallery, London
 2014 - « Exposition collective », Saatchi Gallery, London
 2012 - « Corpus », Musée des Arts Modernes, Moscow
 2012 - « Faces II », Curateur Pietro Di Lecce, Milan
 2011 - « Faces II », Art Basel, Miami
 2011 - « Corps / Décors», Youth’s Talking, Casablanca
 2011 - « Art Paris», Saatchi Gallery, Paris

References

French contemporary painters
21st-century French painters
French Expressionist painters
French male painters
People from Pithiviers
Living people
1984 births